Crângurile is a commune in Dâmbovița County, Muntenia, Romania with a population of 3,399 people. It is composed of eight villages: Bădulești (the commune center), Crângurile de Jos, Crângurile de Sus, Pătroaia-Deal, Pătroaia-Vale, Potlogeni-Vale, Rățești and Voia.

Natives
 Silvia Radu

References

Communes in Dâmbovița County
Localities in Muntenia